The Wasatch Back is a region in the Rocky Mountains in the U.S. state of Utah. It includes cities such as Park City, Heber City, and Morgan. The name Wasatch Back differentiates it from the Wasatch Front, which includes Utah's more populous cities such as Salt Lake City, Ogden, Layton, and Provo. The Wasatch Back sits on the eastern side of the Wasatch Range of the Rocky Mountains, while the Wasatch Front sits on the western side. Wasatch is a Ute Indian word that  means "mountain pass" or "low pass over high range." The Wasatch Back is a very affluent region. Summit County (home to Park City) is one of the wealthiest counties in the United States.

Originally a mining and agricultural region, the Wasatch Back has experienced rapid residential growth through the 1990s and continuing into the 2000s. Local recreational activities include skiing, snowboarding, snowmobiling, hiking, boating, and horseback riding. Park City is the site of numerous concerts and festivals, including the Sundance Film Festival.

Communities

Morgan County

Cities 
 Morgan (county seat)

Census-designated places 

 Enterprise
 Mountain Green

Unincorporated places 

 Croydon
 Littleton
 Milton
 Peterson
 Porterville
 Richville
 Stoddard
 Taggarts
 Whites Crossing

Summit County

Cities 

 Coalville (county seat)
 Kamas
 Oakley
 Park City

Towns 
 Francis
 Henefer

Census-designated places 

 East Basin
 Echo
 Hoytsville
 Marion
 Peoa
 Samak
 Silver Summit
 Snyderville
 Summit Park
 Wanship
 Woodland

Unincorporated communities 

 Bountiful Peak Summer Home Area
 Castle Rock
 Christmas Meadow Summer Home Area
 Emory
 Grass Creek
 Monviso
 Rockport
 Uintalands
 Upton

Wasatch County

Cities 
 Heber City (county seat)
 Midway

Towns 

 Charleston
 Daniel
 Hideout
 Independence
 Interlaken
 Wallsburg

Census-designated places 
 Timber Lakes

Unincorporated communities 

 Center Creek
 Deer Mountain
 Mayflower
 Soldier Creek Estates
 Soldier Summit
 Wildwood (part)

References

External links

Regions of Utah
Wasatch Front
Wasatch Range